R. K. Shriramkumar (born 4 October 1966) is a virtuoso violinist and accompanist of the Carnatic Music (South Indian classical music). He hails from the Rudrapatna family of musicians from Karnataka. He is the grandson of the violinist R. K. Venkatarama Shastri and grand-nephew of R. K. Srikanthan.

Introduction

Rudrapatna Krishnamurthy Shriramkumar was born on 4 October 1966, to Kusuma Krishnamurthy and R. V. Krishnamurthy. His grandfather was the violinist R. K. Venkatarama Shastri, the brother and guru of R. K. Srikantan. He received his initial training from Savitri Satyamurthy and advanced tutelage under his grandfather, R. K. Venkatarama Shastri. He also trained in Vocal Music under D. K. Jayaraman and presently receives guidance from V.V. Subrahmanyam.

Shriramkumar attended the Padma Seshadri Bala Bhavan school in Chennai, Tamil Nadu.

Performing career

Besides solo concerts, Shriramkumar has also accompanied various artists including D. K. Jayaraman, D. K. Pattammal, M. S. Subbulakshmi, K. V. Narayanaswamy, Semmangudi Srinivasa Iyer, T. Brinda, T. Viswanathan and S. Balachander.

In a performing career spanning more than two decades, he has performed for organisations and festivals in India, including Tyagaraja Aradhana festival, Madras Music Academy, Shanmukhananda Sangita Sabha, Sangeet Natak Akademi, the ICCR, the ITC Sangeet Sammelan, the Rajiv Gandhi Foundation, the All India Radio and Doordarshan.

He has also performed at the Rashtrapati Bhavan, New Delhi, accompanying Geeta Rajashekhar in 1988 and Semmangudi Srinivasa Iyer in 1995, in the presence of the then Prime Minister of India Rajiv Gandhi and the then Presidents of India, R. Venkataraman and Shankar Dayal Sharma.

He has toured the United States, Australia, Canada, UK, Europe, Singapore, Malaysia, Mauritius, Sri Lanka and Muscat, accompanying Geetha Rajashekar, Vijay Siva, Sanjay Subrahmanyan, K. V. Narayanaswamy, S. Balachander, T. N. Seshagopalan, N. Ravikiran, P. Unnikrishnan and T. M. Krishna. He has performed for the Theatre De la Ville at Paris accompanying Sanjay Subrahmanyan.

He is a teacher to many upcoming musicians, including Amritha Murali.

Personal life

Shriramkumar is a graduate in Mathematics from the Madras University. He teaches both violin and carnatic vocal music in Chennai, Tamil Nadu. He frequents many concerts in his free time and travels the world on a yearly basis for many prominent artists. He also considers both D. K. Pattammal and M. S. Subbulakshmi as his Gurus. In February 2009, Shriramkumar was married to his wife Akila.

References

1966 births
Living people
Carnatic violinists
21st-century violinists